Cover Your Eyes is the second album from Greensboro, North Carolina band Sullivan.  The record debuted at #37 on the Billboard Top Heatseekers.

Track listing
All songs written by Brooks Paschal, Zach Harward, Phil Chamberlain, Tyson Shipman and Jeremy Stanton.

 "F-Stop" (3:08)
 "Goodbye, Miss Havisham" (3:10)
 "Tell Me I'm Wrong" (3:10)
 "Great for My Collection" (3:11)
 "Florida Queen" (3:13)
 "Olive Branch" (3:49)
 "The Process" (3:15)
 "Dig Me Up" (4:04)
 "Israel Hands" (3:25)
 "Fire Away" (4:00)

References

2007 albums
Sullivan (band) albums
Tooth & Nail Records albums
Albums produced by James Paul Wisner